Nichola Petra "Niky" Wardley (born 11 August 1973) is an English stage and screen actress. Her most notable role is schoolgirl Lauren Cooper's sidekick in the BBC's Emmy and BAFTA-nominated sketch series The Catherine Tate Show (2004–2007). She also appeared alongside Catherine Tate in the Netflix mockumentary sitcom Hard Cell (2022) and played the lead role in the BBC One sitcom In with the Flynns (2011–2012). As a voice actress, she is best known for her role as the Eighth Doctor's companion Tamsin Drew in audio dramas based on the BBC's long-running science fiction series Doctor Who.

Early life and education 
Wardley was born on 11 August 1973 in Luton, Bedfordshire. She started out in acting when she was in high school. Her drama teacher cast her as Nancy in Oliver! when she was about 13 years old. Reminiscing on her first ever role, Wardley said: "I knew from the very first moment that I stepped out on stage that this was what I wanted to do with my life."

She studied acting at the London Academy of Music and Dramatic Art.

Career

Work with Catherine Tate 

While doing her first theatre production for the Royal Shakespeare Company, called A Servant to Two Masters (2000–2001), she met comedian Catherine Tate and shared a dressing room with her for ten months. In 2004, Tate invited Wardley to her BBC Two sketch series, The Catherine Tate Show (2004–2007). Her most notable role in the show was schoolgirl Lauren Cooper's sidekick, Liese Jackson. In November 2005, she performed for Queen Elizabeth II and Prince Philip at the Royal Variety Performance, appearing again in the guise of Liese. During the sketch, Wardley's character remarked: "That old man sitting next to her has fallen asleep." Prince Philip then reportedly complained to the show's executive producer, saying he had been insulted.

The Catherine Tate Show lasted for three series and received critical acclaim and multiple nominations from BAFTA, the National Television Awards and the British Comedy Awards. After the show ended, Wardley and Tate continued to work together on other projects, including the show's spin-off series, Catherine Tate's Nan (2014–2015), and its UK, Australian and New Zealand live tours. She also appeared alongside Tate in the autobiographical short film My First Nativity (2010), the Netflix mockumentary series Hard Cell (2022), which she also co-wrote, and the feature films Nativity 3: Dude, Where's My Donkey?! (2014) and The Nan Movie (2022).

Doctor Who 

In 2010, she portrayed a companion of the Eighth Doctor (Paul McGann), failing actress Tamsin Drew, in the audio series The Eighth Doctor Adventures, produced by Big Finish Productions and based on the BBC's long-running science fiction series Doctor Who. She felt "really excited" about becoming a Doctor Who companion, having previously watched the show as a kid and being good friends with fellow companion actress Catherine Tate. Wardley was cast after being recommended to the producers by the Fifth Doctor actor, Peter Davison, with whom she had previously worked in the ITV drama series The Complete Guide to Parenting (2006). After a period of travelling with the Doctor, Wardley's character became disillusioned with him after he showed coldness in the face of others' deaths whilst favouring the lives of his friends. The Meddling Monk soon convinced her that the Doctor was a destructive force in the universe and took her under his wing. Drew travelled with the Monk for a while, but later came to regret her decision, as he told her countless lies and had sided with Earth's invaders, the Daleks. She helped the Doctor try to stop the Daleks but was eventually killed by them in the story "To the Death" (2011).

In November 2013, the Eighth Doctor mentioned Tamsin Drew among his past companions in the BBC iPlayer mini-episode "The Night of the Doctor", making her part of the official television canon. In the same month, Wardley appeared as writer Steven Moffat's receptionist in the one-off comedy homage to Doctor Who, The Five(ish) Doctors Reboot. Since 2016, she has continued to work with Big Finish and has played several other characters in Doctor Who-related audio adventures, most notably Donna Noble's school friend Natalie Morrison in the four-part audio series Donna Noble: Kidnapped! (2020).

Other work 
In 2006, Wardley played Joe Macer's daughter Megan in two episodes of the BBC One long-running soap opera EastEnders. She also played the lead role in the BBC One sitcom In with The Flynns (2011–2012), followed by appearances in nine episodes of Coronation Street (2012). She was then cast as Miss Brahms in the one-off revival episode of Are You Being Served? (2016). Her other television appearances include Benidorm (2007–2008), Silent Witness, My Family (both 2007), Peep Show (2008), How Not to Live Your Life (2008), Shameless (2010), The Spa, Love and Marriage (both 2013), Asylum (2015), Home from Home (2018) and Call the Midwife (2019).

From 2000 to 2022, she starred in 13 theatrical productions. Her stage work includes Alan Ayckbourn's plays Bedroom Farce (2009) and A Small Family Business (2014), as well as William Shakespeare's Much Ado About Nothing (2007–2008), starring Zoë Wanamaker and Simon Russell Beale as Beatrice and Benedick, and Twelfth Night (2017), starring Tamsin Greig as Malvolia. Both A Small Family Business and Twelfth Night were professionally recorded and broadcast through National Theatre Live.

As a voice actress, she has provided the voice of Tamara the Poodle in most episodes of the CBBC animated children's series The Pinky and Perky Show (2008–2009).

Personal life 
Born in Luton, Wardley now lives in Camberwell, London, and has two children. In May 2018, she married Welsh actor Daniel Hawksford, with whom she had previously worked in the National Theatre production of Shakespeare's Much Ado About Nothing (2007–2008). In 2022, they both appeared in the Netflix mockumentary sitcom Hard Cell.

Filmography

Film

Television

Audio

Theatre

References

External links

Niky Wardley at British Comedy Guide

Alumni of the London Academy of Music and Dramatic Art
English film actresses
English stage actresses
English television actresses
Living people
Royal Shakespeare Company members
English Shakespearean actresses
1973 births
English voice actresses
British voice actresses
British television writers
English television writers
British stage actresses